Osceola Township is one of sixteen townships in Franklin County, Iowa, United States.  As of the 2010 census, its population was 268 and it contained 129 housing units.

History
Osceola Township was created in 1857.

Geography

Cities, towns, villages
 Ackley (north quarter)

Unincorporated towns
 Faulkner at 
(This list is based on USGS data and may include former settlements.)

Cemeteries
The township contains Oak Wood Cemetery, Pleasant Hill Cemetery and Saint Marys Cemetery.

Transportation
 Iowa Highway 57

School districts
 Agwsr Community School District

Political districts
 Iowa's 4th congressional district
 State House District 54
 State Senate District 27

References

External links
 City-Data.com

Townships in Iowa
Townships in Franklin County, Iowa
Populated places established in 1857
1857 establishments in Iowa